Thiruvilaiyaadal Aarambam is a 2006 Indian Tamil-language romantic comedy film directed by Boopathy Pandian and produced by Vimala Geetha. Dhanush and Shriya Saran play the lead roles, while Prakash Raj, Karunas and Saranya Ponvannan play other pivotal roles. The film, which had music composed by D. Imman, was released on 15 December 2006.

Plot
Thirukumaran is a carefree, laid-back guy who has a great time with his friends Tiger Kumar, Sukumar and others. He falls in love with Priya, who is the sister of Guru, a rich business tycoon. The story is about a cat-and-mouse game between Thiru and Guru, who is against Thiru and Priya's love. Thiru wins the game at the end.

Cast

Production
The film was announced in late August 2005 with Boopathy Pandian and Dhanush coming together after a previous collaboration in Devathayai Kanden (2005). Pandian had previously discussed the role with Bharath, but the actor's refusal meant that Dhanush was chosen. Shriya Saran, who rose to fame in Tamil films after her role in Mazhai, was signed after Jyothika opted out due date clashes, as the heroine and the film was titled as Naveena Thiruvilayadal, though the prefix was later dropped. The following September, actor Sivaji Ganesan's Fan Club requested the film's producer, Vimala Geetha, to change the name of the film Thiruvilayadal. They had felt that the title was reminiscent of Ganesan's 1965 film of the same name, and felt that the new venture would defame the old film. K. Bhagyaraj was initially pencilled in to play Dhanush's father in the film, but was later replaced by Mouli due to the delay of the film. Shriya Saran was forced to opt out of the film in October 2005 owing to her commitment to work in Rajinikanth's Sivaji. Reports suggested that either Tamannaah or Ileana may be approached to replace her, while the film's inactivity led to rumours that the film was cancelled.

However, in January 2006, Boopathy Pandian confirmed that the film would continue and the remaining portions would be swiftly completed. Shriya however returned to work on the film after she was able to allot dates.

Release
The film opened in December 2006. Rediff.com noted that "Director Boopathy Pandian has a looser hold on pacing, ensuring that the interest never flags", adding that "the real reason to watch Thiruvilaiyadal Aarambam is Dhanush, who epitomises the new age hero: he is no superman, he is not even close to perfect, and he is thoroughly unapologetic about it all." Another critic from Indiaglitz mentioned that "Bhoopathy Pandian has a fair grasp of what makes an entertainer click with the comedy. His simple handling of an easy subject sees it through." Sify cited that "Dhanush as the hyperactive Thiru is simply superb and his ability to deliver funny lines casually is uncommendable. Prakash Raj does his role to perfection, while Shriya looks good and her costumes are fabulous."

The film grossed  in Tamil Nadu - the highest grosser for actor Dhanush at that time. Post-release after being offended by a remark in the film, Bank of Baroda contemplated taking action against the film by trolling their bank name which ultimately spoils their bank's name.

Dubbed versions and remakes

In 2007, the film was remade as Takkari. It was also remade and released in Kannada as Dhool in 2011, with Prakash Raj reprising his role. Furthermore, it was then remade and released in Bengali as Idiot in 2012, and in Oriya as Rangila Toka. It was also remade in Bangladeshi Bengali as Daring Lover. The movie was uncredited remade in Burmese as Chocolate Baby.

The film was also dubbed in Hindi as Super Khiladi Returns and released in 2015 and it was dubbed in Bhojpuri as Khel Khiladi Bhaiya Ke. In 2021,it was Dubbed in Malayalam under the same title and had a Direct TV Telecast in Zee Keralam.

Soundtrack

The soundtrack of the film was composed by D. Imman and won good reviews upon release in 13 October 2006. The lyrics were penned by Vairamuthu, Na. Muthukumar, Viveka and Thiraivannan. The soundtrack also features a remixed version of the song "Ennama Kannu" Music Composed by Maestro Ilaiyaraaja from the movie Mr. Bharath (1986).

References

External links
 

2006 films
Tamil films remade in other languages
2000s Tamil-language films
Films scored by D. Imman
Indian romantic comedy films
Films directed by Boopathy Pandian
2006 romantic comedy films